Kępiny  is a settlement in the administrative district of Gmina Bytnica, within Krosno Odrzańskie County, Lubusz Voivodeship, in western Poland.

The settlement has a population of 20.

References

Villages in Krosno Odrzańskie County